Five ships in the United States Navy have been named USS Iris for Iris, who in Greek mythology is the goddess of the rainbow

 , was commissioned in 1847, served during the Mexican–American War and was decommissioned in 1848
 , was built in 1863, served in the American Civil War, and decommissioned in 1865
 , was a monitor built as USS Shiloh in 1865, renamed Iris in 1869 and decommissioned in 1874
 , was commissioned in 1898 and decommissioned in 1916
 , was a lighthouse tender, built in 1897, transferred to the US Navy in 1917 and returned to the Department of Commerce in 1919

United States Navy ship names